In computing, echo is a command that outputs the strings that are passed to it as arguments. It is a command available in various operating system shells and typically used in shell scripts and batch files to output status text to the screen or a computer file, or as a source part of a pipeline.

Implementations
The command is available in the following operating systems:
 Multics
 TSC FLEX
 MetaComCo TRIPOS
 Zilog Z80-RIO
 Microware OS-9
 DOS
 Acorn Computers Panos
 Digital Research FlexOS
 IBM OS/2
 Microsoft Windows
 ReactOS
 HP MPE/iX
 KolibriOS
 SymbOS
 Unix and Unix-like operating systems

Many shells, including all Bourne-like (such as Bash or zsh) and Csh-like shells as well as COMMAND.COM and cmd.exe implement echo as a builtin command.

The command is also available in the EFI shell.

History
echo began within Multics. After it was programmed in C by Doug McIlroy as a "finger exercise" and proved to be useful, it became part of Version 2 Unix. echo -n in Version 7 replaced prompt, (which behaved like echo but without terminating its output with a line delimiter).

On PWB/UNIX and later Unix System III, echo started expanding C escape sequences such as \n with the notable difference that octal escape sequences were expressed as \0ooo instead of \ooo in C.

Eighth Edition Unix echo only did the escape expansion when passed a -e option, and that behaviour was copied by a few other implementations such as the builtin echo command of Bash or zsh and GNU echo.

On MS-DOS, the command is available in versions 2 and later.

Nowadays, several incompatible implementations of echo exist on different operating systems (often several on the same system), some of them expanding escape sequences by default, some of them not, some of them accepting options (the list of which varying with implementations), some of them not.

The POSIX specification of echo leaves the behaviour unspecified if the first argument is -n or any argument contain backslash characters while the Unix specification (XSI option in POSIX) mandates the expansion of (some) sequences and does not allow any option processing. In practice, many echo implementations are not compliant in the default environment.

Because of these variations in behaviour, echo is considered a non-portable command on Unix-like systems and the printf command (where available, introduced by Ninth Edition Unix) is preferred instead.

Usage examples
C:\>echo Hello world
Hello world

Using ANSI escape code SGR sequences, compatible terminals can print out colored text.

Using a UNIX System III-style implementation:

BGRED=`echo "\033[41m"`
FGBLUE=`echo "\033[35m"`
BGGREEN=`echo "\033[42m"`

NORMAL=`echo "\033[m"`

Or a Unix Version 8-style implementation (such as Bash when not in Unix-conformance mode):

BGRED=`echo -e "\033[41m"`
FGBLUE=`echo -e "\033[35m"`
BGGREEN=`echo -e "\033[42m"`

NORMAL=`echo -e "\033[m"`

and after:

echo "${FGBLUE} Text in blue ${NORMAL}"
echo "Text normal"
echo "${BGRED} Background in red"
echo "${BGGREEN} Background in Green and back to Normal ${NORMAL}"

Portably with printf:

BGRED=`printf '\33[41m'`
NORMAL=`printf '\33[m'`
printf '%s\n' "${BGRED}Text on red background${NORMAL}"

See also
 List of Unix commands
 List of DOS commands

References

Further reading

External links

Microsoft TechNet Echo article

Internal DOS commands
MSX-DOS commands
OS/2 commands
ReactOS commands
Windows commands
Multics commands
Standard Unix programs
Unix SUS2008 utilities
Plan 9 commands
Inferno (operating system) commands
IBM i Qshell commands